Ostrom or Öström is a Swedish surname meaning "island stream". Notable people with the surname include:

 Elinor Ostrom (1933–2012), American political economist
 Ellen Ostrom, former dancer in the New York City Ballet's corps de ballet
 Gilbert Wellington Ostrom (1837–1917), Ontario lawyer and political figure
 Hans Ostrom (born 1954), American professor, writer, editor, and scholar
 John Ostrom (1928–2005), American paleontologist
 Magnus Öström,  drummer for the Esbjörn Svensson Trio
 Meredith Ostrom (born 1977), American actress, model, and painter
 Tom Ostrom (1936–1994), American psychologist
 Vincent Ostrom (1919–2012), American political scientist
 Walter Ostrom, ceramic artist
 Robert Ostrom (born 1998), American entomologist
 Sydney Ostrom (born 1998), American physicist

See also 
 Ostrum (disambiguation)
 Oestrum (disambiguation)

Swedish-language surnames